Ulpian (c. 170223? 228?) was a Roman jurist born in Tyre (then Phoenicia, today Lebanon). He moved to Principate Rome and rose to become considered one of the great legal authorities of his time. He was one of the five jurists upon whom decisions were to be based according to the Law of Citations of Valentinian III, and supplied the Justinian Digest about a third of its contents.

Biography
The exact time and place of his birth are unknown. The period of his literary activity in which we are interested was between AD 211 and 222. He made his first appearance in public life as assessor in the auditorium of Papinian and member of the council of Septimius Severus; under Caracalla he was master of the requests (magister libellorum). Elagabalus (also known as Heliogabalus) banished him from Rome, but on the accession of Severus Alexander (222) he was reinstated, and finally became the emperor's chief adviser and Praefectus Praetorio.

During the Severan dynasty, the position of Praetorian prefect in Italy came increasingly to resemble a general administrative post, and there was a tendency to appoint jurists such as Papinian, who occupied the post from 203 until his elimination and execution at the ascent of Caracalla. Under Severus Alexander the Praetorian prefecture was held by Ulpian until his assassination by the Guard in the presence of the Emperor himself.

His curtailment of the privileges granted to the Praetorian Guard by Elagabalus provoked their enmity, and he narrowly escaped their vengeance; ultimately he was murdered in the palace by the Guard, possibly in the course of a riot between the soldiers and the mob.

Works
His works include Ad Sabinum, a commentary on the ius civile, in over 50 books; Ad edictum, a commentary on the Edict, in 83 books; collections of opinions, responses and disputations; books of rules and institutions; treatises on the functions of the different magistrates — one of them, the De officio proconsulis libri x., being a comprehensive exposition of the criminal law; monographs on various statutes, on testamentary trusts, and a variety of other works. His writings altogether have supplied to Justinian's Digest about a third of its contents, and his commentary on the Edict alone about a fifth. As an author, he is characterized by doctrinal exposition of a high order, judiciousness of criticism, and lucidity of arrangement, style, and language. He is also credited with the first life table ever.

Domitii Ulpiani fragmenta, consisting of 29 titles, were first edited by Tilius (Paris, 1549). Other editions are by Hugo (Berlin, 1834), Booking (Bonn, 1836), containing fragments of the first book of the Institutiones discovered by Endlicher at Vienna in 1835, and in Girard's Textes de droit romain (Paris, 1890).

Legacy
In the study of law, Ulpian may be best remembered for the phrase "Juris praecepta sunt haec: honeste vivere, alterum non laedere, suum cuique tribuere (The basic principles of law are: to live honorably, not to harm any other person, to render each his own)".

It had been assumed for a long time that Ulpian of Tyre was a model for Athenaeus' Ulpian in The Deipnosophists — or The Banquet of the Learned. Athenaeus makes 'Ulpian' out to be a grammarian and philologist, characterised by his customary interjections: "Where does this word occur in writing?". He is represented as a symposiarch and he occupies a couch alone; his death is passed over in silence in Book XV 686c. Scholars today agree that Athenaeus's Ulpian is not the historical Ulpian, but possibly his father.

A potential date of the real Ulpian's death, 228 AD, has been wrongly used to estimate the date of completion of The Deipnosophists.  However the year of his death cannot be determined with certainty.  Robert Lee Cleve makes a compelling case that Ulpian died in 223, citing a papyrus discovered in 1966.

See also
 Praetorian prefect
 Pandects
 Papinian
 Julius Paulus Prudentissimus

Notes

References
 Tony Honoré, Ulpian: Pioneer of Human Rights, Oxford University Press, 2002.

External links

 

170s births
223 deaths
Ancient Roman jurists
Severan dynasty
2nd-century Romans
3rd-century Romans
2nd-century writers
3rd-century writers
Praetorian prefects
Year of birth uncertain
Annii
Domitii
Ancient Roman murder victims